Banca Nazionale del Lavoro S.p.A. (BNL) is an Italian bank headquartered in Rome. It is Italy's sixth largest bank and has been a subsidiary of BNP Paribas since 2006.

History

Founded in 1913 as Istituto Nazionale di Credito per la Cooperazione, it was nationalized in 1929.  It was re-privatized and listed on the Milan Stock Exchange in 1998, before being acquired by French banking group BNP Paribas in 2006.

Banca Nazionale del Lavoro began Argentine operations in 1960, ultimately opening 91 branches, before selling its operation there to HSBC Bank Argentina in 2006.

In 2016 the company opened a contemporary all glass building for their headquarter: BNL BNP Paribas headquarters.

Scandals
The bank was involved in a major political scandal (dubbed Iraqgate by the media) when it was revealed in 1989 that the Atlanta, Georgia, branch of the bank was making unauthorized loans of more than US$4.5 billion to Iraq.  Many of the loans that the branch made were guaranteed by the United States Department of Agriculture's Commodity Credit Corporation program.  The loans were originally intended to finance agricultural exports to Iraq, but were diverted by Iraq to buy weapons.  The branch manager, Christopher Drogoul, indicated that the bank's headquarters office was aware of these loans, but senior bank official denied this.  Drogoul pleaded guilty to three felony charges and served 33 months in federal prison.

Ownership
At the year end of 2004 the major shareholders with more than 2% were 
 BBVA 14.75190%
 Assicurazioni Generali 8.71980%
 Diego Della Valle (Dorint Holding S.A.) 4.99436%
 Stefano Ricucci Trust (Magiste International S.A.) 4.98985%
 Francesco Gaetano Caltagirone 4.96904%
 Danilo Coppola (PACOP SpA) 4.92611%
 Banca Monte dei Paschi di Siena 4.41788%
 Giuseppe Statuto (Michele Amari Srl)  4.09248%
 Banca Popolare di Vicenza 3.63682%
 Vito Bonsignore (Gefip Holding SpA)  3.07572%

After a short period of Unipol minority ownership as well as the exposed bancopoli scandal, BNP Paribas signed an agreement with 13 shareholders of BNL, representing 48% shares of BNL on 6 February 2006. BNP Paribas also made offer to buy all the remain shares from the public and delisted the company from Borsa Italiana. MPS sold the shares to Deutsche Bank instead.

Gallery

See also
Bancopoli
Saving and loan scandal
Bank of Credit and Commerce International

References

External links
  
 Transcript of U.S. Rep. Henry Gonzalez hearing on BNL connection to purchase of dual use equipment by Saddam Hussein

Banks of Italy
BNP Paribas
Banks established in 1913
Companies based in Rome
Italian companies established in 1913
Companies formerly listed on the Borsa Italiana